Tabarre is a commune in the Port-au-Prince Arrondissement, in the Ouest department of Haiti. It is part of the urbanized area of Port-au-Prince, just northeast of the main part of the city, and next to Delmas.

The Haitian government Autorité Aéroportuaire Nationale is based in Tabarre.

References

Populated places in Ouest (department)
Communes of Haiti